Kang Chang-mo (Hangul: 강창모; born January 26, 1982), better known by his stage name KCM (Hangul: 케이씨엠), is a South Korean singer. He debuted in 2003 with the song "I Know", from the soundtrack to the Korean drama, Punch (Hangul: 때려).

Personal life 
On January 13, 2022, Kang has recently registered for marriage with his non-celebrity girlfriend who is 9 years younger than him. The wedding ceremony has been postponed due to the COVID-19 situation.

Discography

Studio albums

Extended plays

Singles

Filmography

Film

Web series

Television shows

Web show

Music video appearances

Awards and nominations

References

External links 
 

1982 births
K-pop singers
Living people
21st-century South Korean male singers